The Saturn Award for Best Actress is one of the annual Saturn Awards given by the American professional organization, the Academy of Science Fiction, Fantasy & Horror Films. The Saturn Awards are the oldest film-specialized reward of achievements in science fiction, fantasy, and horror (another award, the Hugo Award is older but includes other genres and media). The Saturn Award included the Best Actress category for the first time in the 1974 film year.

The Saturn Award for Best Actress is the oldest prize to reward actresses in science fiction, fantasy, and horror films: other awards such as the Academy and Golden Globe Awards, despite supposedly disregarding the genre, gave little recognition to acting quality at the time. In 1996 the Saturns began to reward both film and television acting, and created the Saturn Award for Best Actress on Television. For the first two years it was awarded there were no nominees announced.

The actresses with the most nominations are Jamie Lee Curtis, Jodie Foster, Natalie Portman, Naomi Watts and Sigourney Weaver, who are all tied with five. Curtis, Foster, Portman, Watts and Sandra Bullock are the only actresses to have won it twice. Portman and Michelle Yeoh are the only actresses to win both the Saturn Award and the Academy Award for Best Actress for the same film, while Weaver holds the record for most nominations for playing the same character (Ellen Ripley) with four. Foster is the youngest winner in this category, winning her first award in 1977 at age 13.

Winners and nominees 
Legend:

1970s

1980s

1990s

2000s

2010s

2020s

Multiple nominations
6 nominations
 Natalie Portman

5 nominations
 Jamie Lee Curtis
 Jodie Foster
 Nicole Kidman
 Naomi Watts
 Sigourney Weaver
 Emily Blunt

4 nominations
 Angelina Jolie
 Jennifer Lawrence
 Cate Blanchett

3 nominations
 Jessica Chastain
 Margot Kidder
 Julianne Moore
 Michelle Pfeiffer
 Daisy Ridley
 Ally Sheedy
 Jessica Tandy
 Charlize Theron

2 nominations
 Amy Adams
 Karen Allen
 Nancy Allen
 Kathy Bates
 Kate Beckinsale
 Helena Bonham Carter
 Sandra Bullock
 Ellen Burstyn
 Neve Campbell
 Geena Davis
 Melinda Dillon
 Kirsten Dunst
 Carrie Fisher
 Linda Hamilton
 Anjelica Huston
 Catherine Keener
 Jennifer Lopez
 Frances McDormand
 Penelope Ann Miller
 Lupita Nyong'o
 Rosamund Pike
 Winona Ryder
 Sharon Stone
 Meryl Streep
 Uma Thurman
 Mia Wasikowska
 Michelle Yeoh

Multiple wins
2 wins
Sandra Bullock
Jamie Lee Curtis
Jodie Foster
Natalie Portman
Naomi Watts

References

External links
 
Past Winners Database. Saturn Awards

Actress (Film)
Film awards for lead actress

pl:Nagroda Saturn w kategorii najlepsza aktorka drugoplanowa